Cathryn Lewis is Professor of Genetic Epidemiology and Statistics at King's College London. She is Head of Department at the Social, Genetic and Developmental Psychiatry Centre, Institute of Psychiatry, Psychology and Neuroscience.

She completed her BA in mathematics at St. Hilda’s College, University of Oxford, and her PhD in statistics at the University of Sheffield. She then spent five years at the University of Utah working on projects to identify BRCA1 and BRCA2 genes, before joining King’s College London in 1996.  She now leads the Statistical Genetics Unit at King’s College London, a multi-disciplinary research group that develops and applies statistical methods to human genetics, to identify and characterise genes contributing to common, complex disorders.

In the Psychiatric Genomics Consortium, the international collaboration for sharing and analysing genetic data, she co-chairs the Major Depressive Disorder Working Group, with Professor Andrew McIntosh.  She is an editor for journal Biological Psychiatry: Global Open Science.  She was also an academic editor for journals PLOS Medicine and an Associate Editor for Human Heredity.  She leads the Medical Research Council's Skills Development Fellowship programme at King's College London.

She featured in a BBC news feature broadcast on the Victoria Derbyshire (TV programme), where James Longman asked the question “Do you inherit your parent's mental illness?” and a mental health special issue of the BBC’s Trust Me I’m a Doctor.

In 2010, Lewis was part of the "Music from the Genome" team which analysed the DNA from 40 members of the New London Chamber Choir. These gene patterns were used to create a choral work, "Allele". The music subsequently won Michael Zev Gordon the 2011 British Academy of Songwriters, Composers and Authors Composer of the Year award.

Selected publications

References

21st-century British biologists
21st-century British women scientists
Academics of King's College London
Alumni of the University of Oxford
British women biologists
British geneticists
Genetic epidemiologists
Living people
Year of birth missing (living people)